Q3A may refer to:
Quake III Arena, a first-person shooter video game developed by id Software
Q3A Panel house, a type of German panel house